Balaka is a genus of 9 known species in the palm family, Arecaceae or Palmae. Seven species are native to the islands of Fiji and two to Samoa. The genus was first proposed and published in Annales du Jardin Botanique de Buitenzorg 2: 91. 1885, from two species originally in the genus Ptychosperma (P. perbrevis and P. seemannii).

Species
Accepted species:

 Balaka diffusa Hodel - Fiji
 Balaka longirostris Becc. - Fiji
 Balaka macrocarpa Burret - Fiji
 Balaka microcarpa Burret - Fiji
 Balaka pauciflora (H.Wendl.) H.E.Moore - Fiji
 Balaka samoensis Becc. - Samoa
 Balaka seemannii (H.Wendl.) Becc. - Fiji
 Balaka streptostachys D.Fuller & Dowe - Fiji
 Balaka tahitensis Christoph. - Samoa

References

 
Arecaceae genera
Taxa named by Odoardo Beccari